This is a list of notable political philosophers, including some who may be better known for their work in other areas of philosophy. The entries are in order by year of birth to show rough direction of influences and of development of political thought.

Ancient (born before 550 CE)

Hammurabi (died c. 1750 BCE)
Confucius (551–479 BCE)
Socrates (470–399 BCE)
Mozi (470–390 BCE)
Xenophon (427–355 BCE)
Plato (427–347 BCE)
Diogenes of Sinope (412–323 BCE)
Aeschines (389–314 BCE)
Aristotle (384–322 BCE)
Mencius (372–289 BCE)
Chanakya (350–283 BCE)
Xun Zi (310–237 BCE)
Han Fei (c. 280–233 BCE)
Thiruvalluvar (c. 200 BCE–c. 30 BCE)
Cicero (106–43 BCE)
Pliny the Younger (63–113 CE)
Saint Augustine (354–430 CE)

Medieval (born between 550 CE and 1450 CE)

Al-Farabi (870–950)
Al-Biruni (973–1050)
Ibn Sina (980–1037)
Al-Ghazali (1058–1111)
Hemachandra (1088–1173)
Ibn Rushd (1126–1198)
Al-Mawardi (972–1058)
Maimonides (1135–1204)
Fakhr al-Din al-Razi (1150–1210)
Thomas Aquinas (1225–1274)
Ibn Taymiyyah (1263–1328)
Marsilius of Padua (1270–1342)
William of Ockham (1285–1349)
Ibn Khaldun (1332–1406)
Christine de Pizan (1363–1434)

Renaissance and early modern (born between 1450 CE and 1750 CE)

Thomas Cajetan (1469–1534)
Niccolò Machiavelli (1469–1527)
Martin Luther (1483–1546)
Thomas Muntzer (1490–1525)
John Calvin (1509–1564)
Francisco Suárez (1548–1617)
Jean Bodin (1530–1596)
Richard Hooker (1554–1600)
Robert Bellarmine (1542–1621)
Francis Bacon (1561–1626)
Hugo Grotius (1583–1645)
Thomas Hobbes (1588–1679)
Gerrard Winstanley (1609–1676)
James Harrington (1611–1677)
John Locke (1632–1704)
Baruch Spinoza (1632–1677)
Montesquieu (1689–1755)
Voltaire (1694–1778)
Muhammad ibn Abd al-Wahhab (1703–1792)
Benjamin Franklin (1706–1790)
David Hume (1711–1776)
Frederick the Great (1712–1786)
Jean-Jacques Rousseau (1712–1788)
Immanuel Kant (1724–1804)
William Blackstone (1723–1780)
Adam Smith (1723–1790)
Edmund Burke (1729–1797)
Thomas Paine (1737–1809)
Thomas Jefferson (1743–1826)
Johann Gottfried Herder (1744–1803)
Jeremy Bentham (1748–1832)

Late modern (born between 1750 CE and 1900 CE)

James Madison (1751–1836)
Joseph de Maistre (1753–1821)
Louis de Bonald (1754–1840)
William Godwin (1756–1836)
Mary Wollstonecraft (1759–1797)
Henri de Saint-Simon (1760–1825)
Johann Gottlieb Fichte (1762–1814)
Thomas Robert Malthus (1766–1834)
Benjamin Constant (1767–1830)
Georg Wilhelm Friedrich Hegel (1770–1831)
Novalis (1772–1801)
David Ricardo (1772–1823)
Samuel Taylor Coleridge (1772–1834)
Charles Fourier (1772–1837)
James Mill (1773–1836)
Adam Müller (1779–1829)
Friedrich Carl von Savigny (1779–1861)
Thomas Carlyle (1795–1881)
Auguste Comte (1798–1857)
John Henry Newman (1801–1890)
Alexis de Tocqueville (1805–1859)
Max Stirner (1806–1856)
John Stuart Mill (1806–1873)
Pierre-Joseph Proudhon (1809–1865)
Mikhail Bakunin (1814–1876)
Henry David Thoreau (1817–1862)
Karl Marx (1818–1883)
Sir Syed Ahmad Khan (1818–1898)
Friedrich Engels (1820–1895)
Herbert Spencer (1820–1903)
Hippolyte Taine (1828–1893)
Thomas Hill Green (1836–1882)
William Graham Sumner (1840–1910)
Namık Kemal (1840–1888)
Gustave Le Bon (1841–1931)
Peter Kropotkin (1842–1921)
Friedrich Nietzsche (1844–1900)
Georges Sorel (1847–1922)
Vilfredo Pareto (1848–1923)
Eduard Bernstein (1850–1932)
Benjamin Tucker (1854–1939)
Thorstein Veblen (1857–1929)
John Dewey (1859–1952)
Rabindranath Tagore (1861–1941)
Max Weber (1864–1920)
Sun Yat-sen (1866–1925)
Benedetto Croce (1866–1952)
Charles Maurras (1868–1952)
Gandhi (1869–1948)
Emma Goldman (1869–1940)
Vladimir Lenin (1870–1924)
Rosa Luxemburg (1870–1919)
Bertrand Russell (1872–1970)
Rudolf Rocker (1873–1958)
Vallabhbhai Patel (1875–1950)
Giovanni Gentile (1875–1944)
Ziya Gökalp (1876–1924)
Muhammad Iqbal (1877–1938)
Martin Buber (1878–1965)
Leon Trotsky (1879–1940)
Oswald Spengler (1880–1936)
Otto Bauer (1881–1938)
Jacques Maritain (1882–1973)
Ivan Ilyin (1883–1954)
Georg Lukács (1885–1971)
René Guénon (1886–1951)
Carl Schmitt (1888–1985)
Jawaharlal Nehru (1889–1964)
B. R. Ambedkar (1891–1956)
Antonio Gramsci (1891–1937)
Walter Benjamin (1892–1940)
Max Horkheimer (1895–1973)
Ernst Jünger (1895–1998)
Julius Evola (1898–1974)
Herbert Marcuse (1898–1979)
Wilhelm Röpke (1899–1966)
Leo Strauss (1899–1973)
Friedrich Hayek (1899–1992)
Erich Fromm (1900–1980)
Muhammad Asad (1900–1992)

Born in 20th century

Michael Oakeshott (1901–1990)
Eric Voegelin (1901–1985)
Karl Popper (1902–1994)
Theodor Adorno (1903–1969)
Ayn Rand (1905–1982)
Raymond Aron (1905–1983)
Jean-Paul Sartre (1905–1980)
Hannah Arendt (1906–1975)
Sayyid Qutb (1906–1966)
Simone Weil (1909–1943)
Isaiah Berlin (1909–1997)
Erik von Kuehnelt-Leddihn (1909–1999)
Norberto Bobbio (1909–2004)
Albert Camus (1913–1960)
Russell Kirk (1918–1994)
Louis Althusser (1918–1990)
Murray Bookchin (1921–2006)
John Rawls (1921–2002)
Prabhat Ranjan Sarkar (1921–1990)
Cornelius Castoriadis (1922–1997)
Howard Zinn (1922–2010)
Frantz Fanon (1925–1961)
Murray Rothbard (1926–1995)
Michel Foucault (1926–1984)
Samuel P. Huntington (1927–2008)
Judith Shklar (1928–1992)
Noam Chomsky (1928–)
Jürgen Habermas (1929–)
Alasdair MacIntyre (1929–)
Bernard Williams (1929–2003)
Félix Guattari (1930–1992)
Jacques Derrida (1930–2004)
Ronald Dworkin (1931–2013)
Charles Taylor (1931–)
Guy Debord (1931–1994)
Harvey Mansfield (1932–)
Eqbal Ahmad (1933–1999)
Antonio Negri (1933–)
Ali Shariati (1933–1977)
Fredric Jameson (1934–)
Michael Walzer (1935–)
Edward Said (1935–2003)
Thomas Nagel (1937–)
Robert Nozick (1938–2002)
Jacques Rancière (1940–)
Joxe Azurmendi (1941–)
Robert D. Putnam (1941–)
Gerald Cohen (1941–2009)
Étienne Balibar (1942–)
Roger Scruton (1944–2020)
Slavoj Žižek (1947–)
Roberto Mangabeira Unger (1947–)
Samuel Edward Konkin III (1947–2004)
John Gray (1948–)
Hans-Hermann Hoppe (1949–)
Michael Sandel (1953-)
Kancha Ilaiah (1952–)
Judith Butler (1956–)
Michael Hardt (1960–)

See also
 Political philosophy
 Lists of philosophers

 
Political philosophers